Backe is a locality situated in Strömsund Municipality, Jämtland County, Sweden with 599 inhabitants in 2010.

References

External links 
Backe.nu - Official site

Populated places in Strömsund Municipality
Ångermanland